Carl Ferdinand Appun (24 May  1820,  Bunzlau- July 1872,  Guyana) was a German naturalist.
On the recommendation of Alexander von Humboldt  Appun was employed by Frederick William IV of Prussia as a botanist in Venezuela where excepting a one-year break in Germany, he spent ten years exploring the flora. After that he went to British Guayana, where he researched as a botanist on behalf the British government. He also visited parts of Brazil -the Rio Branco and Rio Negro on the Amazon to Tabatinga. During a visit in Germany (1868–1871) he published a set of essays in different magazines . His best known  work Unter den Tropen (Under the Tropics) was at that time extremely popular. In 1871 he undertook a second  exploration of  Guyana, where he had an accident which led to his death. His  last writings were essays about  Indigenous peoples in Venezuela. 
Appun described many new plant species and is also known as an entomologist.

Works
Über die Behandlung von Sämerein und Pflanzen des tropischen Süd-Amerika, besonders Venezuela’s. Bunzlau 1858
Unter den Tropen: Wanderungen durch Venezuela, am Orinoco, durch Britisch Guyana und am Amazonenstrome in den Jahren 1849-1868. Jena: Costenoble, 1871.
Venezuela. Jena: Costenoble, 1871. Unter den Tropen; 1.
Britisch Guyana. Jena: Costenoble, 1871. Unter den Tropen; 2.
with Eduard Raimund Baierlein Bei den Indianern. Berlin; Leipzig: Hillger, 1915. Deutsche Jugendbücherei; Nr 104

Collections
The Museum für Naturkunde contains Diptera collected by Appun in Colombia.

References
 
 Papavero, N. (1973): Essays on the history of Neotropical dipterology, with special reference to collectors (1750-1905). São Paulo: Museu de Zoologia, Universidade de São Paulo.
 Herbert Scurla (1968): Im Lande der Kariben. Reisen deutscher Forscher des 19. Jahrhunderts in Guayana. Alexander von Humboldt. Robert Schomburgk. Richard Schomburgk. Carl Ferdinand Appun. Berlin: Verlag der Nation, 1964; 3. Auflage.
 Julius Loewenberg (1875): Appun, Karl Ferdinand, in: Allgemeine Deutsche Biographie (ADB), Band 1, Duncker & Humblot, Leipzig.

External links
 

19th-century German botanists
German entomologists
1820 births
1872 deaths
People from Bolesławiec